The Bermuda Broadcasting Company is the largest broadcasting company in Bermuda. Sometimes abbreviated locally as "BBC", it is not related to the BBC, the UK's public broadcasting company. A commercial, for-profit broadcasting company since its beginning in the 1950s, the company was chaired by Fernance B. Perry until his death.

Broadcast stations
The Bermuda Broadcasting Company owns radio stations and TV stations using the call letters "ZFB" and "ZBM". The ZBM callsign in particular is one of the oldest in Bermuda – this callsign has been used since 1953 for an AM radio station, since 1962 for an FM radio station, and was also used, beginning in 1958, for the first Bermudian television station, which gave Bermudians their own TV station after years of watching a TV channel intended for American servicemen stationed at Kindley Field. ZFB was originally the callsign for the radio and TV stations of the Capital Broadcasting Company from 1965 to 1984.

Labour unrest
In 2008, in the wake of labour unrest and amidst a staff shake-up at the broadcasting company, Fernance Perry told the Royal Gazette that the firm's future outlook is "bright". The following year, a strike by 40 unionised employees in April 2009, halted all programming at the company's radio and television stations for four days. Perry said that changes in work rules and staff pay were needed "to help a financially ailing company". The work stoppage was settled, and normal operations resumed on 21 April, after government mediation.

Radio
 Bermuda Spirit, formerly ZFB, on 1230 kHz (transmitter power: 1 kW), It is a general mix of local, religious, adult contemporary formats.

 ZFB-FM (branded as "Power95 Stereo FM") on 94.9 MHz (ERP: 1 kW) on air since 1971, broadcasting in the urban/reggae format.

 ZBM on 1340 kHz (transmitter power: 1 kW). It started broadcasting in 1953, and the station's format is news and talk, with some music programming.

 ZBM-FM (branded as "Ocean89") on 89.1 MHz (ERP: 15 kW), broadcasting since 1962. Its specific format is the adult contemporary format.

Television
 ZFB-TV, virtual channel 20.2 (UHF digital channel 20), is the affiliate station for ABC; however, when ZFB used to be part of the Capital Broadcasting Company, the TV station broadcast on VHF channel 8.

 ZBM-TV, virtual channel 20.1 (UHF digital channel 20), is the affiliate station for CBS; however, when ZBM originally began broadcasting in 1958, it used to be on VHF channel 10. Both channels are currently carried on Bermuda's cable television system.

See also 
 Caribbean Broadcasting Union

References 

Hardyman, Nicholas. World Radio Television Handbook. Volume 59, 2005.

External links
Bermuda Broadcasting website

Mass media in Bermuda